The 10th Gran Premio Ciudad de Buenos Aires was a  Formula Libre motor race held on 31 January 1954 at the Autódromo 17 de Octubre in Buenos Aires. The race was won by Maurice Trintignant in the Ecurie Rosier Ferrari 625. Roberto Mieres in a Maserati A6GCM was second and José Froilán González and Giuseppe Farina shared another Ferrari 625 for third, Farina's car having retired earlier. Farina also qualified on pole and set fastest lap.

The event was marred by the death of team owner Enrico Platé, killed when Jorge Daponte's car spun and crashed into the pit lane.

Classification

References

Buenos Aires Grand Prix
Buenos Aires Grand Prix
Buenos Aires Grand Prix